Joseph Gladwin (22 January 1906 – 11 March 1987) was an English actor, best known for his roles as Fred Jackson in Coronation Street, Stan Hardman in Nearest and Dearest, and Wally Batty in the world's longest-running sitcom, Last of the Summer Wine (1975–87).

Biography
Gladwin was born at 44 Tatton Street in the Ordsall district of Salford, Lancashire, the son of Joseph and Elizabeth (née Dooley) Gladwin. His father was a coal dealer. Gladwin was baptised on 28 January 1906 at Mount Carmel Roman Catholic Church, Ordsall, and educated at the parish school. He married Lily Anne Wynne on 30 December 1933 at Mount Carmel Church. Gladwin was appointed a Papal Knight (of the Order of St. Gregory the Great) for his charity work.

Before his professional career took off, Gladwin performed with The Decoys during World War II, a Concert Party based in Chorlton-cum-Hardy in Manchester. This Concert Party (ENSA) entertained the troops in hospitals and elsewhere. At the time, Gladwin was a driver for a company delivering medicines to chemists (from an interview with Joyce Bishop, 3 November 2018, daughter of one of the members of The Vocals).

Gladwin served as northern representative of the Catholic Stage Guild. Despite his lifelong rhotacism he became well known in British television, especially prominent from 1975 until his death in 1987.

Career

Gladwin worked as a 'feed' for Dave Morris for twelve years beginning in 1950. He appeared on British television from the 1960s onwards, making notable appearances in Z-Cars, Dixon of Dock Green and The Artful Dodger. He had a recurring role in Coronation Street between 1961 and 1966 as Fred Jackson, owner of the local fish and chip shop. Between 1968 and 1973 Gladwin appeared in Nearest and Dearest as Stan Hardman, a long time worker in fictional Pledge's Pickle factory, set in Colne, Lancashire and starring alongside Hylda Baker and Jimmy Jewel.  He also appeared in Last of the Summer Wine from 1975 to 1986 and had completed work on the show’s ninth series and 1986 Christmas special before his death.

His film credits included appearances in Three Hats for Lisa (1966), Charlie Bubbles (1967), Work Is a Four-Letter Word (1968), The Reckoning (1969), the film version of Nearest and Dearest (1972), Escape from the Dark (1976) and Yanks (1979).

Death
Gladwin died on 11 March 1987, aged 81, in the Greater Manchester Hospital, in Crumpsall. He had been ill for some time with Bronchial Cancer which resulted in Bronco-Pneumonia complications. He is buried at St Mary's Roman Catholic Cemetery just off the A6 road at Wardley, Greater Manchester.

References

External links
 

1906 births
1987 deaths
Male actors from Salford
English male film actors
English male television actors
English people of Irish descent
English Roman Catholics
20th-century English male actors
Knights of St. Gregory the Great
British male comedy actors